George Achtymichuk (born c. 1935) is a Canadian former curler. He played second on the  team (skipped by Harvey Mazinke), representing Saskatchewan. They later went on to win second place at the World Championships of that year.

As of 1975, he was working as a school teacher in Regina, Saskatchewan and was the leader and bass-guitarist in the band The Melody Mates which included members of his curling team. He grew up in Stoughton, Saskatchewan.

References

External links

 George Achtymichuk – Curling Canada Stats Archive
 Video: 

Canadian male curlers
Brier champions
1930s births
Living people
Curlers from Regina, Saskatchewan
Canadian schoolteachers 
Canadian bass guitarists
20th-century Canadian people